Charnwood may refer to:

County of Leicestershire, United Kingdom 
 Borough of Charnwood, a local government district in the county of Leicestershire, England
 Charnwood (UK Parliament constituency), Leicestershire constituency in the British House of Commons
 Charnwood (ward), an electoral ward and administrative division of the city of Leicester, England
 Charnwood College, Loughborough
 Charnwood Forest, within the borough

Other uses 
 Operation Charnwood, a Second World War Anglo-Canadian operation during the Battle of Normandy that captured northern Caen
 Charnwood, Australian Capital Territory, a suburb of Canberra, Australia
 The Barons Charnwood, barons in the Peerage of the United Kingdom
 Godfrey Benson, 1st Baron Charnwood (1864–1945), British politician and biographer of Abraham Lincoln and Theodore Roosevelt; known as Lord Charnwood